The Canadian International Comedy Film Festival (CICFF), formerly the Shärt International Comedy Film Festival (SICFF), takes place in Winnipeg, Manitoba, Canada, each February.

The 10th festival took place on 8 October 2022, at the Cinematheque theatre and the Park Theatre.

History 
The festival was established in 2013 as the Shärt International Comedy Film Festival (SICFF), funded through a grant by a Winnipeg family via the Shärt Foundation. The festival acrimoniously parted ways with the Foundation in 2018 and, following legal proceedings during that year's festival, it was revived in 2019 as the Canadian International Comedy Film Festival.

The 8th festival was scheduled for 29 February 2020, to take place at the Park Theatre, Winnipeg.

Awards
The awards offered are:
Best Canadian Comedy Film Award — Best film from a Canadian filmmaker
Best International Comedy Film Award — Best comedy film from a country other than Canada
Best Mockumentary Award — The best comedic documentary-style film
Peoples Choice Award — Best film as chosen by the audience as well as online voters during the festival
Rom Com Award — Best romantic comedy film
The Select Award — "The film most loved by the CICFF board of governors"
Shorty Award — The best film under 1 minute

In addition to the above, the festival also occasionally gives special awards depending on the film and year.

Winners

2021

2019

2018

References

External links
 
Canadian International Comedy Film Festival at FilmFreeway.com 

Film festivals in Winnipeg
Comedy festivals in Canada
Comedy film festivals
Film festivals established in 2013